The David Dworman Three-Decker is a historic triple decker in Worcester, Massachusetts.  Built in 1926 for the builder's family, it is a remarkably well-built and preserved example of a Craftsman style triple decker.  The building was listed on the National Register of Historic Places in 1990.

Description and history
The David Dworman Three-Decker is located in Worcester's southern Vernon Hill neighborhood, on the east side of Providence Street (Massachusetts Route 122A) opposite Vernon Hill Park.  It is a three-story wood frame structure, with a hip roof, from which a three-window shed-roof dormer projects.  The ground floor is finished in wide wooden clapboards, while the upper floors are finished in wooden shingles.  The main facade is asymmetrical, with a recessed porch stack on the left and bands of four sash windows on the right.  The porches feature square columns set above the enclosed balustrades.  There is a projecting rectangular bay on the side, with bands of three sash windows at each level, and a pedimented gable above that has a diamond-light window at the center.

The triple decker was built c. 1926 by David Dworman, a major developer of the Vernon Hill area, for the family's use.  The Dwormans were responsible for building a number of triple deckers in the Woodford Street area just to the east.  In addition to the Dwormans, early residents included merchants and salesmen.

See also
National Register of Historic Places listings in eastern Worcester, Massachusetts

References

Apartment buildings on the National Register of Historic Places in Massachusetts
Houses completed in 1926
Apartment buildings in Worcester, Massachusetts
National Register of Historic Places in Worcester, Massachusetts